Viviane de Queiroz Pereira (born October 17, 1994), better known by her stage name Pocah and formerly as MC Pocahontas, is a Brazilian singer-songwriter.

Biography
Viviane de Queiroz Pereira was born in Queimados, Rio de Janeiro on October 17, 1994, and raised in Duque de Caxias. The daughter of Marines de Queiroz and Leonardo Pereira, she is of African, Portuguese and Native Brazilian descent. Prior to her musical career, she worked as a manicure at her mother's beauty salon. Her first contact with music was accompanying her older brother on tours with his rock band when she was 12 years old, and during her high school years she was introduced to funk carioca.

She officially began her career in 2012 releasing the song "Mulher do Poder", which reached over 11 million views on YouTube and was considered a landmark in the then-blooming funk ostentação scene. Her posterior stage name, "MC Pocahontas", came from her physical resemblance to the eponymous Disney character. As the 2010s went by, MC Pocahontas released collaborations with Naiara Azevedo and Dani Russo ("Ó Quem Voltou", which had a music video produced by KondZilla which reached over 6.9 million views), and MC Mirella ("Quer Mais?"); both collaborations were certified Double Platinum and Diamond by Pro-Música Brasil, respectively.

In 2017, rapper Future used a sample of Pocahontas' voice on the song "Fresh Air" off his album Hndrxx. The song was later used by Kylie Jenner in a make-up tutorial.

In early 2019 Pocahontas signed with Warner Music Group, changing her stage name to Pocah to avoid copyright infringement allegations from Disney. Her first release for the label, "Não Sou Obrigada", came out in April; described as an "ode to women's empowerment", it reached over 11 million views on YouTube and 35 million streamings on Spotify.

In January 2021 she was announced as one of the participants of the 21st season of the reality show Big Brother Brasil; on April 29 she became the 15th contestant to be evicted.

Personal life
From 2014 to 2016 Pocah was married to her manager and fellow funk singer Matheus Vargas, known as MC Rouba Cena, with whom she had a daughter, Victória (born 2016). In August 2019 she began a relationship with promoter Ronan Souza, a former boyfriend of Anitta. Later on December they registered their domestic partnership.

Pocah is openly bisexual; she first came out when she was 13 years old. In a 2020 interview for magazine ISTOÉ, she also described herself as a feminist.

Awards and nominations

References

External links
 
 

1994 births
Living people
People from Rio de Janeiro (state)
Funk carioca musicians
Brazilian women pop singers
Brazilian pop singers
Afro-Brazilian women singers
21st-century Brazilian women singers
Afro-Brazilian feminists
Brazilian female models
Afro-Brazilian female models
Brazilian people of indigenous peoples descent
Brazilian people of African descent
Brazilian people of Portuguese descent
Brazilian women singer-songwriters
Big Brother (franchise) contestants
Big Brother Brasil
Bisexual women
Bisexual singers
Bisexual songwriters
Brazilian LGBT singers
Brazilian LGBT songwriters
LGBT Afro-Brazilians
Feminist musicians
LGBT people in Latin music
Women in Latin music
21st-century LGBT people
Brazilian bisexual people